Gehenna is a valley in Jerusalem, and an analogue of Hell or Lake of Fire in Jewish and Christian tradition.

Gehenna may also refer to:

Fiction
Gehenna (comics), girlfriend of DC Comics character Jason Rusch, the current Firestorm
Gehenna (Dungeons & Dragons), an Outer Plane of evil alignment in the fantasy role-playing game Dungeons & Dragons
Gehenna (World of Darkness), the vampires' prophesied Armageddon in the role-playing game Vampire: The Masquerade
Gehenna, a fictional planet, the setting for C. J. Cherryh's 1983 novel Forty Thousand in Gehenna

Film and television
Gehenna (1938 film), a 1938 Polish melodrama
"Gehenna" (Millennium), a 1996 episode of the TV series Millennium
Gehenna: Where Death Lives (2018 film), an American-Japanese horror film

Music
Gehenna (band), a Norwegian black/death metal band 
Gehenna, a 2001 EP by metal band Before the Dawn, and its title track
"Gehenna", a song by metal band Slipknot on the 2008 album All Hope Is Gone

See also
 Hades
 Hell
 Hell in popular culture
 Jahannam, an Islamic concept of Hell